Antiotricha pluricincta is a moth of the subfamily Arctiinae. It was described by Paul Dognin in 1918. It is found in Colombia.

References

Moths described in 1918
Arctiini
Moths of South America